Ferguson Lake is a lake in the geographic Stewart Township, Nipissing District in Northeastern Ontario, Canada. It is part of the Saint Lawrence River drainage basin.

Ferguson Lake has two unnamed inflows, both at the southwest. The primary outflow is an unnamed creek at the east which flows through several lakes and eventually to the Little Jocko River. The Little Jocko River flows via the Jocko River and the Ottawa River to the Saint Lawrence River.

See also
List of lakes in Ontario

References

Lakes of Nipissing District